Mulah Kandu, Dv. for "Mulah Channel", is the channel between Fuvahmulah and Addu Atoll.

Addu Kandu and Mulah Kandu are geographically one channel. But because Fuvahmulah lies north-east of Addu Atoll, the part of the channel in between Fuvahmulah and Addu Atoll is considered as Mulah Kandu by Geographers. The part of the channel in between Huvadhu Atoll and Addu Atoll with no barrier in between is considered as Addu Kandu. Both the channel divisions together are known as the Equatorial Channel because the Equator lies between Huvadhu Atoll and Fuvahmulah.

Mulah Kandu is one of the deepest and roughest channel in the Maldives. The island of Fuvahmulah lies in this channel and the channel continues to the eastern tip of Addu Atoll Meedhoo Koagannu Faru.

Fuvahmulah in the Mulah Kandu is the first atoll of Maldives in the Southern Hemisphere and the nearest atoll to the Equator. Being so close to the Equator makes Mulah Kandu among the roughest channels in Maldives due to the high pressure winds evolving in the Equator. As a result, Fuvahmulah was often inaccessible to seafarers and travelers in the past. Until Nov 2011, people travelling to Fuvahmulah or from Fuvahmulah to Male' have to be very much dependent on the airport situated in Addu Atoll from where they had to take a ferry to cross the channel, having to undergo the huge challenge of crossing the roughest sea in the country. In 2011 the government of Maldives awarded the bid to develop an airport in the island of Fuvahmulah to the State Trading Organisation. The development of a domestic airport in the island of Fuvahmulah was a dream come true for the residents of Fuvahmulah. Commercial flights were commenced to Fuvahmulah on 11th Nov 2011, and today the national airline of Maldivian, 'Maldivian' flies daily to Fuvahmulah.

Etymology of the name Mulah Kandu 

The name Mulah was derived from Mulah the original name of Fuvahmulah. Kandu in Dhivehi means channel. The meaning of the name must be Mulah Channel by then.

Mulah Kandu and Fuvahmulah 

Over the years there have been no progress ever in the number of visitors to Fuvahmulah due to the isolation of the island as of now with the absence of an airport. Judging from the neutral point of view it can be said that to avoid the present state of isolation and open the island to the whole world the construction of an airport is a must. Crossing the Mulah Kandu takes at least an hour even during the calmest days of the ocean. Surveys conducted on Maldives Customs Service shows that on average 40 people a day travel between Male' and Fuvahmulah and that they spend about MRF. 5 Million every year to travel to Male' through Addu Atoll including the money paid for the launch, taxis, etc... The construction of an airport in Fuvahmulah means a lot of money will be saved and the economical income of the island by then would be a lot greater than now.

Note: "Mulah Kandu" being referred to as a channel between Meemu Atoll Mulah and Veyvah is a generalized misconception which might be caused by carelessly researched tourist publications or other kind of mislead, wrong information. The correct name of the channel between Mulah and Veyvah is Kuda Kanduolhi, the name given by native Maldivians. The origin of the word "Mulah Kandu" might have simply been due to the unawareness among Tourists as well as Maldivians concerning Maldivian Geography. Thinking that there is no name allocated for the channel being unaware, the channel would have been named by the later generations as "Mulah Kandu" originating the name from the name of the island close-by named as Mulah. But the misconceptions have to be cleared and the right names should be used. The right Mulah Kandu is the channel between Fuvahmulah and Addu Atoll. The channels like Kuda Kanduolhi are the smaller channels which are in the Atolls' lagoons. There are thousands of smaller channels like this in Maldives due to the presence of so many islands in an Atoll. They should not be confused with the main Channels of the Maldives.
Aware of the extent of problems of this kind which may arise, Maldivian expert Mr. Ibrahim Luthfee wrote a book on Maldivian geography before he died. With this book, which is unfortunately available only in Divehi, the late Mr. Luthfee tried to clear a number of misconceptions like this that carelessly researched tourist publications have generalized even among Maldivians. Much of this article has been translated and adapted from his posthumous work.

References
 Divehiraajjege Jōgrafīge Vanavaru. Muhammadu Ibrahim Lutfee. G.Sōsanī.

Channels of the Maldives
Channels of the Indian Ocean